Nikolaus Blome (born 16 September 1963) is a German journalist.

Life 
Blome was born in Bonn. He studied at the Henri-Nannen-Schule in Hamburg. From 1991 to 1993, he worked for newspaper Der Tagesspiegel. From 1993 to 2013, he worked for German newspaper Bild. From 2013 to 2015, Blome worked as journalist for the news magazine Der Spiegel. , Blome has been working again for Bild, this time in the position of the vice editor-in-chief. He was also editor-in-chief of the Bild offshoot Bild Politik.

Activities 
 International Journalists' Programmes (IJP), Member of the Board of Trustees

Works 
 Faul, korrupt und machtbesessen? Warum Politiker besser sind als ihr Ruf. wjs Verlag, Berlin 2008, .
 Der kleine Wählerhasser. Was Politiker wirklich über die Bürger denken. Pantheon Verlag, Munich 2011, .
 Angela Merkel. Die Zauder-Künstlerin. Pantheon Verlag, Munich 2013, .

Awards 
 Arthur-F.-Burns-Fellowship (1993)
 Förderpreis by Friedrich und Isabel Vogel-Stiftung (1994)
 Förderpreis for Wirtschaftspublizistik by Ludwig-Erhard-Stiftung (1995)
 Deutsch-Französischer Journalistenpreis – Special award by Asko Europa-Stiftung (1996)
 Theodor Wolff Prize (2007)
 State Street-Award for Finanzjournalisten (2011)
 Herbert Quandt Medien-Award (2011)
 Henri Nannen Prize'' (2014) for best investigative work (together with nine other journalists at SPIEGEL)

References

External links 

 
 
 Articles by Nikolaus Blome (Spiegel Online)

German male journalists
20th-century German journalists
21st-century German journalists
German business and financial journalists
German male writers
Der Spiegel people
Bild people
1963 births
Writers from Bonn
Living people